Cirsilineol is a bioactive flavone isolated from Artemisia and from Teucrium gnaphalodes.

References 

O-methylated flavones